Bepea is a moth genus in the subfamily Spilomelinae of the family Crambidae.

The name Bepea is a replacement name, or nomen novum, proposed by Koçak & Kemal in 2007. The new name was necessary because the previous genus name, Notesia Yamanaka, 1992, was a junior homonym of Notesia Casey, 1922, a genus of weevils. Notesia Yamanaka, 1992, however, was also a replacement name, as the original name of the genus, Notaspis Warren, 1892, was a junior homonym of the mite genus Notaspis Hermann, 1804.

The genus currently comprises two species: the type species, Bepea tranquillalis, was described by Julius Lederer in 1863. It is found in Indonesia, Papua New Guinea and Taiwan. A second species, Bepea pyraustalis, was transferred to the genus by Koçak & Kemal (2007). It was described by Embrik Strand in 1918 in the genus Calamochrous based on specimens collected in Kankau and Kosempo on Taiwan.

References

External links

Spilomelinae
Moths of Japan
Crambidae genera
Monotypic moth genera